France Forstnerič (29 January 1933 – 22 May 2007) was a Slovene poet, writer, and journalist.

Forstnerič was born in Pobrežje near Ptuj in 1933. He trained as a teacher and taught for a number of years before becoming a journalist in 1958. He worked for the newspapers Večer and Delo and also obtained a degree in sociology from the University of Ljubljana in 1979. He wrote for adults and children. He is best known for his poetry that he started publishing in the early 1960s. In 1970 he won the Levstik Award for his book Srakač. In 1972 he won the Prešeren Foundation Award for his collection of poems entitled Pijani kurent (The Drunken Kurent).

Published works

 Poetry collections
 Zelena ječa (The Green Jail), 1961
 Dolgo poletje (The Long Summer), 1968
 Pijani kurent (The Drunken Kurent), 1971
 Pesniški list 32 (The Poet's List 32), 1976
 Izbor Pesmi (Collected Poems), 1979
 Ljubstava, 1981
 Drava življenja (The River Drava of Life), 1993

 Prose
 Jabolko (The Apple), 1979
 Brlog (The Den), short stories, 1987

 For Young Readers
 Srakač, 1970
 Bela murva (The White Mulberry), poems, 1976

References

Slovenian poets
Slovenian male poets
Slovenian journalists
Slovenian children's writers
1933 births
2007 deaths
Levstik Award laureates
University of Ljubljana alumni
20th-century poets
People from the Municipality of Videm
20th-century journalists